The Leinster Schoolgirls' Senior Cup is a women's field hockey cup competition organized by the Leinster Hockey Association. It features teams representing schools from Leinster. The competition was established in 1917. Alexandra College are the competitions most successful team, winning the cup for the thirteenth time in 2016. During the 2000s and 2010s, Alexandra College and St. Andrew's College have emerged as the competitions two strongest teams. When Ireland won the silver medal at the 2018 Women's Hockey World Cup, the squad included eight players who had featured in Leinster Schoolgirls' Senior Cup finals. Chloe Watkins played in four finals while Nicola Evans, Gillian Pinder, Hannah Matthews and Emily Beatty all played in three each. Deirdre Duke and Elena Tice both played in two each while Nicola Daly made one appearance. Between 2005 and 2012 at least one member of the squad played in every final.

Ireland's silver medallists
When Ireland won the silver medal at the 2018 Women's Hockey World Cup, the squad included eight players who had played in Leinster Schoolgirls' Senior Cup finals. In the 2005 final Nicola Evans scored the opening goal in a 4–2 win for Alexandra College over a High School, Dublin team that included Nicola Daly. In the 2006 final 13-year-old Chloe Watkins scored St. Andrew's College's second goal in a 2–0 win over a Loreto, Beaufort team that included Hannah Matthews. In 2007 Nicola Evans scored again for Alexandra College in a 5–0 win against a St. Andrew's College team that included Chloe Watkins and Gillian Pinder. In 2008 Hannah Matthews scored the winner from a penalty corner as Loreto Beaufort defeated an Alexandra College team featuring Nicola Evans and Deirdre Duke 2–1. In 2009 Matthews captained Loreto, Beaufort as they faced a St. Andrew's team featuring Chloe Watkins and Gillian Pinder. This time St. Andrew's won 2–0 after extra time. In 2010 Chloe Watkins captained St. Andrew's as they defeated an Alexandra College team that featured Deirdre Duke and Emily Beatty. Gillian Pinder scored the opening goal in a 2–0 win. In 2011 the same two teams again featured in the final. This time Alexandra College with Duke and  Beatty defeated a St. Andrew's College team that included  Pinder 2–1. In 2012 Emily Beatty scored the opening goal as  Alexandra College defeated Wesley College 4–1.
Elena Tice scored the winner as St Gerard's School, Bray won the cup for the first time in 2015. She also played in the 2016 final but finished on the losing team.

Recent finals

Notes

References

Leinster
1917 establishments in Ireland
field hockey